Temirlan Medetbekovich Sultanbekov is a Kyrgyz politician. He is the leader of the opposition  party Social Democrats in the Kyrgyz Republic.

Biography 
Temirlan Medetbekovich Sultanbekov was born on September 12, 1998, in a military family in the town of Balykchy, Issyk-Kul Region, in Eastern Kyrgyzstan. His father, Medet Sultanbekov, is a colonel and ex-head of the main department of the General Staff of the Armed Forces of the Kyrgyz Republic, and is a co-author with European researchers of a number of books. His mother, Kyyal Toktorbaev, is a retired officer of the border troops of the Kyrgyz Republic.

In politics 
Sultanbekov joined the SDPK party at 18.

From 2018 to 2019, he was the official representative of the Social Democrats of Kyrgyzstan in the Russian Federation. He accompanied ex-president Almazbek Atambayev on his visit to Moscow.

In the parliamentary elections of 2020, he refused the proposals of the authorities and pro-government parties and was a candidate for deputy in the top ten from the political party Social Democrats. On October 10, 2020, after the revolution in Kyrgyzstan, he was detained by law enforcement agencies for organizing mass riots and attempting a coup.

Participation in October 2020 events in Kyrgyzstan 
On October 13, the Pervomaisky District Court of Bishkek decided to detain Temirlan Sultanbekov for two months, however, as a result of great public support, Temirlan Sultanbekov was released on October 14 by the decision of the Bishkek City Court. Temirlan Sultanbekov was supported by: General Secretary of the Socialist International Luis Ayala, Political Party "Fair Russia", Prime Minister of Kyrgyzstan Sadyr Zhaparov, politicians Omurbek Babanov, Zhanar Akaev, Irina Karamushkina, Mirlan Jeenchoroev, Almambet Shykmamatov, Altynai Omurbekova, Dastan Bekeshev, Adakhan Madumarov, Urmat Dzhanybaev, Klara Sooronkulova and others. Also, public figures and cultural figures spoke in support of Sultanbekov: Syimyk Beishekeyev, Mirbek Atabekov, Nazira Aitbekova, Syezdbek Iskenaliev, Kairat Primberdiev, Assol Moldokmatova and others.

On October 14, 2020, in the evening, Sultanbekov met with Sadyr Zhaparov and supported him "in order to expel Jeenbekov"

On October 15, 2020, President Sooronbai Jeenbekov resigned. On October 26, 2020,  Sultanbekov announced that he refused to be part of the government. According to him, the current government does not have a clear strategy, plans and will to implement major reforms in Kyrgyzstan. According to Sultanbekov, Sadyr Japarov is "already under the influence of a number of people, and today the state is plunging into chaos, lawlessness, dictatorship, corrupt people come to power, the country's Constitution is not respected.”

October 27, 2020 Acting President of the Kyrgyz Republic Sadyr Zhaparov said in a video interview that he dismissed Akylbek Zhaparov from the post of adviser to the head of state because he spoke unflatteringly about Sultanbekov. During the adoption of the new Constitution, Akylbek Zhaparov proposed to amend the age limit for deputies of the JK KR from 21 to 25 years old, Temirlan Sultanbekov was 22 years old.

As party leader 

On February 12, 2021, Temirlan Sultanbekov was elected chairman of the party at the congress of the Social Democrats party with the support of ex-president Almazbek Atambayev. In the elections of city councils of deputies under the leadership of Temirlan Sultanbekov, the party passed in a number of cities: Kant (7%), Orlovka (20%), Kemin (8.8%), Shopokov (10%), Kara-Balta (14.5%) , Cholpon-Ata (18.7%), as well as in the capital, Bishkek (8.5%).

References 

1998 births
Living people